is a Japanese football player. He plays for Shonan Bellmare.

Career
Hirokazu Ishihara joined J1 League club Shonan Bellmare in 2016. On June 5, he debuted in J.League Cup (v Vissel Kobe).

Club statistics
Updated to 13 December 2022.

References

External links
Profile at Shonan Bellmare

1999 births
Living people
Association football people from Kanagawa Prefecture
Japanese footballers
J1 League players
J2 League players
Shonan Bellmare players
Avispa Fukuoka players
Association football defenders